is a passenger railway station on the Tōbu Urban Park Line located in Ōmiya-ku, Saitama, Saitama Prefecture, Japan, operated by the private railway operator Tōbu Railway.

Lines

Station layout
The station consists of two opposed side platforms serving two tracks, connected to the station building by a footbridge.

Platforms

Adjacent stations

History

The station opened on 17 November 1929.

From 17 March 2012, station numbering was introduced on all Tōbu lines, with Ōmiya-kōen Station becoming "TD-03".

Passenger statistics
In fiscal 2019, the station was used by an average of 9772 passengers daily.

Surrounding area
Ōmiya Park
Hikawa Shrine

See also
 List of railway stations in Japan

References

External links

 Tobu station information 

Railway stations in Saitama (city)
Tobu Noda Line
Stations of Tobu Railway
Railway stations in Japan opened in 1929